Diethyl carbonate (sometimes abbreviated DEC) is an ester of carbonic acid and ethanol with the formula OC(OCH2CH3)2.  At room temperature (25 °C) diethyl carbonate is a colorless liquid with a low flash point.

Diethyl carbonate is used as a solvent such as in erythromycin intramuscular injections. It can be used as a component of electrolytes in lithium batteries.  It has been proposed as a fuel additive to support cleaner diesel fuel combustion because its high boiling point might reduce blended fuels' volatility, minimizing vapor buildup in warm weather that can block fuel lines. As a fuel additive, it can reduce emissions such as volatile organic compounds, CO2, and particulates.

Production

It can be made by reacting phosgene with ethanol, producing hydrogen chloride as a byproduct.  Because chloroform can react with oxygen to form phosgene, chloroform can be stabilized for storage by adding 1 part (by mass) of ethanol to 100 parts (by mass) of chloroform, so that any phosgene that forms is converted into diethyl carbonate.

2 CH3CH2OH + COCl2 → CO3(CH2CH3)2 + 2HCl

It can also be made by the alcoholysis of urea with ethanol. This reaction requires a heterogeneous catalysis that can act both as a Lewis acid and a base, such as various metal oxides. The reaction proceeds via the formation of the intermediary ethyl carbamate.

2 CH3CH2OH + CO(NH2)2 → CO3(CH2CH3)2 + NH3

It can also be synthesized directly from carbon dioxide and ethanol using various methods, and via oxidative carbonylation with carbon monoxide. Another method is transesterification from dimethyl carbonate. Yet another method is from the reaction of ethyl nitrite and carbon monoxide, where the ethyl nitrite can be made from nitric oxide and ethanol. This method requires a catalyst such as palladium.

See also
 Ethylene carbonate

References

Ester solvents
Ethyl esters
Carbonate esters